Saurin Bhattacharjee (1926-1997) was an Indian politician. He was a Member of Parliament, representing West Bengal in the Rajya Sabha, the upper house of India's Parliament, as a member of the Revolutionary Socialist Party.

References

Rajya Sabha members from West Bengal
Revolutionary Socialist Party (India) politicians
1926 births
1997 deaths